The Horsey Horseless was an early automobile created by Uriah Smith, a Seventh-day Adventist preacher, and inventor, in Battle Creek, Michigan. It contained a wooden horse head and neck attached to the front of the car, intended to make it resemble a horse and carriage so it won't frighten horses on the road. It was known to be created in 1899 but it is unknown whether or not it was ever built. The horse head was hollow to hold fuel. It is on Time Magazine's worst car list.

See also
Skeuomorph, a derivative object that retains ornamental design cues from structures that were necessary in the original

References

External links

1890s cars